Rami Määttä (born 3 April 2002) is a Finnish professional ice hockey player for Ässät of the Finnish Liiga.

References

External links
 

2002 births
Living people
Ässät players
Finnish ice hockey defencemen
People from Oulu